"Ricochet!" is the first single from Shiny Toy Guns' second album Season of Poison. The single peaked #17 on the Alternative Songs Chart. It is their highest charting single to date on the Alternative Songs Chart.

Music video
Produced by Teleprompt Films, the music video was directed by Israel Anthem.

Usage in other media
It is featured on an episode of Gossip Girl in Season 2 Episode 14 "In the Realm of the Basses"
It is used in a promo for the NFL
It was featured on an episode of Knight Rider
It was used in New World Disorder 9.
It is also featured on Tony Hawk Ride.
It was featured in the movie Wall Street: Money Never Sleeps

References

2008 singles
Shiny Toy Guns songs
2008 songs
Songs written by Gregori Chad Petree
Universal Motown Records singles
Songs written by Jeremy Dawson
Songs written by Sisely Treasure